Pani câ meusa (also spelled  or less correctly pani ca meusa;  is a Sicilian street food. It is a dish typical of Palermo and it consists of a soft bread (locally called vastedda or vastella) topped with sesame, stuffed with chopped veal lung and spleen that have been boiled and then fried in lard. Caciocavallo or ricotta may also be added, in which case the pani câ meusa is called  ("married" in Sicilian); if served without cheese, it is called  ("single") instead. It is sold mainly by street vendors (specifically indicated locally as ) in Palermo's main markets such as the Vucciria and the Ballarò.

Brooklyn, New York

Among Sicilian-Americans in Brooklyn, New York, especially in Bensonhurst, pane ca meusa has influenced other hero sandwiches, especially the "roast beef hero". In 1968, The Original John's Deli opened on the corner of Stillwell Avenue and 86th Street by Sicilian immigrants John and Maria Cicero. There was now easy access to roast beef and therefore, they decided to use roast beef in their business, preparing roast beef heroes adding mozzarella, gravy and onions to the hero, becoming a Brooklyn staple and would eventually be renamed the "Johnny Roast Beef" after a character from the movie GoodFellas. Other places took note of this sandwich and added them to their menu or created their own variation to the sandwich including Roll N' Roaster, Brennan and Carr, and Defonte's.

See also

Palermo
Vastedda

References

External links
 

Palermitan cuisine
Cuisine of Sicily
Offal sandwiches
Street food in Italy
Cuisine of New York City
Italian-American culture in New York City
Sicilian-American culture